Gabriel Rivano is an Argentine bandoneonist, guitarist, flutist and composer, born in Buenos Aires in 1958.

He pursued studies at the Colegio Nacional de Buenos Aires where he graduated in 1976, and took his degree in Economics at the Universidad Nacional de Buenos Aires. He also was a soccer player and bandoneón player.

In 1990 Gabriel Rivano established the "Gabriel Rivano Quinteto". For this ensemble he composed numerous pieces of chamber music and several concerts, classified in the genres of classical music, jazz and folk music.

His "Concierto para Bandoneón y Orquesta" (concert for bandoneon, guitar and orchestra)  had its world premiere at the "Teatro Colón" in Buenos Aires in 1997, which was awarded with the 1st prize in the international competition organized by Secretaría de Cultura de la Nación Argentina.

Gabriel Rivano's grandfather was the Argentine bandoneonist Adolfo Perez Pocholo.

Discography 

 1990: Gabriel Rivano
 1993: Mestizo
 1997: Tradición
 2000: Porto Seguro
 2002: Bach en Buenos Aires
 2003: Infierno Porteño
 2003: Tangos y Milongas
 2003: Piazzola en bandoneón
 2006: Meditacion Beat
 2007: La Luminosa
 2009: Tangos Nuevos

References 
 Official Artist Website

1958 births
Living people
Argentine songwriters
Male songwriters
Argentine bandoneonists
Argentine classical bandoneonists
Argentine classical composers
People from Buenos Aires
20th-century classical composers
Argentine tango musicians
20th-century male musicians